Fire and Emergency New Zealand is New Zealand's main firefighting and emergency services body.

Fire and Emergency was formally established on 1 July 2017, after the New Zealand Fire Service, the National Rural Fire Authority, and 38 rural fire districts and territorial authorities amalgamated to form one new organisation. It has nationwide responsibility for fire safety, firefighting, hazardous substance incident response, vehicle extrication and urban search and rescue.

History
New Zealand's first volunteer fire brigade was established in Auckland in 1854, with volunteer fire brigades established in Christchurch in 1860, Dunedin in 1861, and in Wellington in 1865. The Municipal Corporation Act 1867 allowed borough councils to establish fire brigades and appoint fire inspectors, starting the first paid fire brigades. The Fire Brigades Act 1906 set up local fire boards, and levied central government, local authorities and insurance companies to cover costs.

During the summer of 1945/46, a large scrub and forest fire threatened the town of Taupo and blocked the Rotorua–Taupo Road. In response, the Forest and Rural Fires Act 1947 established the modern rural firefighting force.

On 18 November 1947, Christchurch's Ballantynes department store was gutted by fire, killing 41 employees. The resulting Royal Commission of Inquiry found that the store' evacuation scheme was inadequate, the fire brigade was slow to be informed of the fire, and the firefighters were not properly trained or equipped. The Commission proposed a national fire service, however this was rejected. The Fire Services Act 1949 instead set up the Fire Service Council to coordinate urban fire brigades, direct firefighter training and distribute equipment. In 1958, the first national training school for firefighters was established. On 29 September 1958, the first 111 emergency telephone service was introduced covering Masterton and Carterton, and was gradually expanded nationwide through the 1960s and 1970s.

The Fire Service Act 1975 replaced the Fire Service Council with a new Fire Service Commission, and merged local fire boards and urban volunteer fire brigades into a single entity, the New Zealand Fire Service.

The Forest and Rural Fires Act 1977 established the National Rural Fire Authority under the New Zealand Fire Service Commission to coordinate the various rural fire authorities.

Fire and Emergency was formally established on 1 July 2017, merging the New Zealand Fire Service, the National Rural Fire Authority, and 38 rural fire districts and territorial authorities.

An independent report by Judge Coral Shaw into the culture of Fire and Emergency New Zealand released in January 2019 found a widespread culture of bullying and harassment, including sexism and racism. The Chief Executive of Fire and Emergency noted the report was "wide ranging and confronting."

Governance
Fire and Emergency is a Crown Entity and is governed by a Crown Appointed Board. The Minister for Internal Affairs is the minister responsible for Fire and Emergency. The CEO is appointed by the State Services Commissioner.  The Executive Leadership Team is responsible for service delivery and implementation in accordance with the Fire and Emergency Act.

Roles and functions

The main functions of Fire and Emergency are those where it has responsibility to respond, and has lead responsibility in a multi-agency emergency. These include:
 firefighting
 fire safety and prevention
 Hazardous Materials (HAZMAT) – The containment of a hazardous substance and decontamination of an environment or persons affected by a hazardous substance.
 vehicle extrication – Extrication of entrapped persons in the aftermath of a motor vehicle accident
 urban search and rescue (USAR) – Fire and Emergency NZ is the lead agency for New Zealand USAR operations (Civil Defence & Emergency Management Act 2002) They also manage three USAR Task Force level teams, providing communications and resources. Being the lead agency, Fire and Emergency NZ also coordinates the 17 NZ Response Teams which also provide light USAR support. Paid career firefighters have a baseline level of training in USAR techniques and make up the vast majority of the actual USAR team members.

Fire and Emergency also has a number of additional functions which it may assist in, but not at the compromise of its main functions. These are typically functions where another agency has lead responsibility in a multi-agency emergency. These additional function include:
 medical first response – Responding to medical emergencies in smaller communities where there is no local ambulance service, as well as in the main centres when an ambulance is unavailable or will be significantly delayed in attending an incident.
 medical co-response – Co-responding with ambulance services to "Code Purple" emergencies (e.g. cardiac and respiratory arrest)
 rescue (high angle line, confined spaces, swift water, etc.) – Rescue from the side of buildings; dangerous terrain (cliff/rock faces, etc.)
 natural disaster response – Addressing the problems caused by heavy rain and high winds (lifted roofing, power lines and trees down onto properties or across roadways, flooding)

Fire and Emergency's jurisdiction covers the majority of New Zealand's land mass. The Department of Conservation is no longer responsible for fires as Fire and Emergency are the fire authority for all public conservation land. DOC support Fire and Emergency in this function. This means any fire that starts or develops on public conservation land will be controlled by Fire and Emergency under their authority, and DOC will support them. New Zealand Defence Force are responsible for fire services covering the land under their control . Industry fire brigades provide fire services to certain facilities such as major airports and industrial plants. Fire and Emergency provides mutual assistance to these brigades.

Staffing

Career staff
Fire and Emergency New Zealand employ 1,854 professional career firefighters as well as 993 management and support staff.

Each career fire station has a number of watches (shifts). Full-time career stations have four watches, red, brown, blue and green, rotating on a "four-on four-off" schedule: two 10-hour day shifts, followed by two 14-hour night shifts, followed by four days off. However, most Career districts now rely on calling back off duty staff to provide additional resources at any large scale or long duration incident. Combination career and volunteer stations may have had a yellow watch, in which career staff work four 10-hour day shifts per calendar week, having one weekday, Saturday and Sunday off. Non-operational staff were "black watch", and work a regular 40-hour week.

Career Firefighters responded to 80% of all the incidents Fire and Emergency attend and protect 80% of the population.

Career firefighters numbers were relatively stable with low turnover. Fire and Emergency usually recruit twice-yearly, and received up to 700 applications for just 48 positions on each intake, making competition high and job prospects poor compared to other industries. Initial training for career firefighters was done on an intensive 12-week residential course at the national training centre in Rotorua that covered not only traditional firefighting subjects but others required of a modern professional Fire and Rescue Service. Topics such as; urban search and rescue (USAR), motor vehicle extrication and hazardous materials.

Career firefighters provided the Fire and Emergency personnel that staff the nations specialised USAR Response teams. Additional specialised training was provided for these personnel, however all paid career firefighters were trained to a baseline USAR 'Responder' level.

Volunteers

Ranks and insignia
The epaulette markings used by Fire and Emergency are similar to those used by the New Zealand Police and the New Zealand Army, except for the use of impellers instead of pips and bars in place of chevrons. The current colour scheme for helmets was rolled out in late 2013, with the intention to make it easier to identify the command structure at a large-scale, multi-agency incident.

Appliances and vehicles
The basic urban appliance in New Zealand is the Pump Tender and the Pump Rescue Tender. The Pump Tender is primarily equipped for fires, while the Pump Rescue Tender is additionally equipped with rescue equipment for motor vehicle accidents and vehicle extrication.

Vehicle Callsigns 
Fire and Emergency uses a relatively simple callsign system. In most cases, the callsign of any particular vehicle has; for the first part, two numbers which represent the station it is from, and one or two numbers representing the type of appliance it is. For Example, Auckland City's main pump appliance, Auckland City 207, has "20" representing the station - Auckland City; and "7" representing the type of appliance - Pump Rescue Tender.

This is a list of commonly encountered appliance callsigns (the latter, in this case, meaning the appliance type):

Pump types 1 through 3, for example 831 (The main pump appliance at East Coast Bays Station). xx1 is usually a station's primary pump. xx2 is almost always a secondary pump. Pumps are somewhat limited in their specialised firefighting abilities, for example, highrise firefighting or forestry firefighting. In terms of local fires, for example, a small house fire, or car fire, the pump has more than enough equipment to suffice. A type 3 heavy pump, mainly found in larger cities with career crews carries about 1500 litres of water, whereas a smaller type 1 or 2, light and medium respectively, each carry about 2000 litres, as these trucks usually respond to incidents in areas with unreticluated water supplies. The former contains much more equipment, as career firefighters receive much more training,; whereas volunteers receive less at a national level. This means that career firefighters have a much higher overall skill and training level. One example of this is that a type three has two High-Pressure Deliveries (HPD), whereas a type 1 or 2 only has one; an HPD is a high-pressure hose, which unravels from the truck directly. The HPD is usually one of the first pieces of equipment used at a firefighting event.

Notable incidents 

Major notable incidents where Fire and Emergency or its predecessors have played a significant role include:

Auckland Central fire, 1858 – a fire broke out in central Auckland, eventually destroying an entire city block.
Parliament Buildings fire, 1907 – fire broke out around 2 a.m. on 11 December 1907. The building could not be saved.
 Seacliff Lunatic Asylum fire, 1942 – on the evening of 8 December 1942, a fire broke out in Ward 5 at the Seacliff Lunatic Asylum, north of Dunedin, killing 28 of the 39 female patients housed within. A shortage of nursing staff due to World War II, as well as the lack of sprinklers in the ward, contributed to the deaths.
 Ballantyne's fire, 1947 – on 18 November 1947, a fire broke out at the Ballantyne's department store in central Christchurch, killing 41 people. It remains the deadliest fire in New Zealand.
 Sprott House fire, 1969 – on 26 July 1969, a fire broke out at the Sprott House rest home in Karori, Wellington, killing seven of the 21 residents. As a result, the Fire Safety (Evacuation of Buildings) Regulations 1970 were made, making sprinklers, automatic alarms and evacuation schemes compulsory for institutions housing more than 20 people.
 ICI Riverview fire, 1984 – on 21 December 1984, a fire broke out at the ICI Riverview chemical warehouse in Mount Wellington, Auckland, killing one person. Thirty-one firefighters suffered ill effects from the toxic fumes given out in the fire.
Avondale College fire, 1990 – on the evening of 10 April 1990, a fire broke out at Avondale College in Auckland, destroying the administration block, assembly hall, gymnasium, and thirteen classrooms. At its peak, 200 firefighters and 26 fire appliances fought the blaze.
 Wither Hills fire, 2000 – The main fire, which broke out in the Wither Hills behind Blenheim, swept across more than 6500ha, destroying farmland and wiping out stock.
 Tamahere coolstore fire, 2008 – on 5 April 2008, Hamilton firefighters were called out to a fire alarm activation at the Icepak Coolstores southeast of the city at Tamahere. While investigating the cause of the alarm the propane-based refrigerant ignited explosively, injuring all eight firefighters and destroying one fire engine. One firefighter, Senior Station Officer Derek Lovell, later died in hospital as a result of his injuries. The fire was upgraded to a fifth-alarm response, with appliances coming from as far afield as Onehunga and Taupo. A water tender from nearby Hamilton Airport and Fonterra milk tankers were also called in to assist with water supply. Icepak Coolstores and the refrigeration company contracted to maintain the coolstores pleaded guilty to health and safety breaches, and combined were ordered to pay $393,000 in fines and reparation.
 Southdown Freezing Works fire, 2008 – on 20 December 2008, Auckland firefighters were called out to a reported building fire in the suburb of Southdown. Upon crews arriving, a call was made to transmit a sixth-alarm response. Almost every crew from all over Auckland responded with at least two appliances coming from Rotorua and Hamilton. There was suspected asbestos inside some of the buildings that were alight, causing it to feed the fire.
 Port Hills fire, 2017 – on the evening of 13 February 2017, two separate fires, several kilometres apart, started on the Port Hills near Christchurch. The two fires merged on 15 February and by the time the fire was brought under control on 19 February, it had burned over 2000 hectares of land and destroyed 11 houses. One helicopter crashed while helping to fight the fires, causing the death of the pilot.
Pigeon Valley fire, 2019 - on the afternoon of 5 February 2019, a fire broke out in a paddock in Pigeon Valley near Wakefield. The fire doubled in size overnight. At its height it covered 2400 hectares, and was the largest wildfire seen in New Zealand in sixty years. It prompted the declaration of a state of emergency. By February 6 it had been brought under control, with the fire extinguished on the surface for some time, but by 14 February 133 homes were still off limits with residents unable to return. Fire crews continued working on underground hot spots into March. One helicopter crashed during the course of the fire injuring its pilot. It is believed to be the largest wildfire in New Zealand history.
 New Zealand International Convention Centre fire, 2019 - at approximately 13:15 on 22 October 2019, a fire started on the roof of the under-construction International Convention Centre in downtown Auckland. With strong winds gusting through the city, the fire grew rapidly and by 15:30 had escalated up to a sixth alarm; the first time since 2008's Southdown fire that this alarm level had been used. The fire was officially declared "under control" by Fire and Emergency late on the afternoon of 23 October, but flare-ups continued until the evening of 28 October.

See also
List of New Zealand firefighters killed in the line of duty

References

External links 

 Fire and Emergency New Zealand Act 2017
 Independent Review of Fire and Emergency New Zealand's workplace policies, procedures and practices to address bullying and harassment 
 Official Website

Fire protection organizations
Government agencies of New Zealand
Fire
Fire departments
Wildfire suppression agencies
Firefighting in New Zealand